At least three ships of the Pakistan Navy have been named Alamgir:

, a  launched as HMS Creole in 1945 she was transferred to Pakistan and renamed in 1958. She was scrapped in 1982.
, a  launched as USS Cone in 1945 she was transferred to Pakistan and renamed in 1982. She was scrapped in 1998.
, an  launched as USS McInerney in 1978 she was transferred to Pakistan and renamed in 2010. 

Pakistan Navy ship names